Reality Check! (full title: Super Information Hijinks: Reality Check!) is a comedic science fiction original English-language manga series written by Rikki Simons and drawn by Tavisha Wolfgarth-Simons, together known as Studio Tavicat; unlike conventional manga, Reality Check!'''s art is full-color, painted by Rikki Simons (although it appears black-and-white in print). Set in a near-future world of 2012, the story centers on Collin Meeks, a young cat owner who discovers his cat, Catreece, has been regularly entering the world of online virtual reality gaming and the general "Virtual Internet System" (VIS). The story covers the online and offline activities and interactions of the Colin and his friends (including Catreece), who all utilize form of virtual-reality (VR) headgear called a "True Virtual Reality (TVR) Helmet" to experience the futuristic internet and gaming environs.

It was originally available online in full color (the pages painted by Rikki Simons) but was also released as comic book in two volumes. The first in 1995, consisting of two black and white issues published by Tavicat Comics, and the second from 1996 to 1998, consisting of 12 full color issues published by Sirius Entertainment. The Tavicat issues were reprinted in color in the first 2 issues of the SIRIUS run. Tokyopop picked up the title in 2003 and reprinted the SIRIUS run in a black and white digest-sized format consisting of two volumes.

Plot

Catreece
When Catreece is connected to VIS via the TVR helmet, her avatar takes the form of a catgirl. Since she has at least near-human intelligence and can communicate with humans through ordinary speech in the online worlds, she is effectively a technologically enabled werecat, albeit one which started as a cat rather than human.  This rule also applies for Catreece's sister, Mimi, who is not only owned by Lili, the younger sister of Colins' friend Maiko, but also taught Lili everything she learned from an internet hermit. Her character design uses elements from anime and other animation, including Disney.

Releases
The first two volumes of Reality Check! were original released by Tavicat Comics in 1995. Following those releases, Sirius Entertainment reprinted in full color the first two issues and released 10 additional issues from 1996 to 1998.

Tokyopop picked up the title in 2003 and reprinted the SIRIUS run as two black and white digest-sized volumes:
 Volume 1 (March 2003)
 Volume 2 (May 2003)

A successful Kickstarter in 2015 allowed the Simons to release the full comics run in color as a single hardcover volume and a PDF.

ReceptionPublishers Weekly'' described the first volume as having "a sense of fun and imaginative details", and that Catreece is "a character with immense appeal".

See also
Virtual reality
On the Internet, nobody knows you're a dog

References

External links
Studio Tavicat

Original English-language manga
Science fiction comics
Sirius Entertainment titles
1995 comics debuts